Events from the year 1627 in art.

Events
January 25 - Dutch painter Johannes van der Beeck is found guilty of "blasphemy against God and avowed atheism, at the same time as leading a frightful and pernicious lifestyle." 
 The Fontana della Barcaccia in Rome is engineered by Gian Lorenzo Bernini with help from his father.

Works

Rembrandt
The Flight to Egypt (painting)
The Gold Weigher
St. Paul in Prison
Francisco Ribalta – Christ Embracing St. Bernard (1625-7)
Peter Paul Rubens – Albert and Nicolaas Rubens
Anthony van Dyck – The Lomellini Family (1626-7)
Adam Willaerts – Ships on a Dutch roadstead

Births
May 16 – Willem van Aelst, Dutch artist (died 1683)
August 2 – Samuel Dirksz van Hoogstraten (died 1678)
date unknown
Francisco Caro, Spanish Baroque painter (died 1667)
Alexander Coosemans, Flemish Baroque still-life painter (died 1689)
Josse de Corte, French sculptor (died 1679)
Philip Fruytiers, Flemish painter (died 1666)
Onorio Marinari, Italian painter (died 1715)
Jan Siberechts, Flemish painter (died 1703)
Domenico Piola, Genoese painter (died 1703)
Matthias Withoos, Dutch painter of still lifes and city scenes (died 1703)
Ippolito Galantini – Italian painter and monk (died 1706)
probable 
Jan de Bray, Dutch painter (died 1697)
Hendrik Graauw, Dutch Golden Age painter (died 1693)
Jan Thopas, Dutch portraitist (died c.1695)

Deaths
March - Ippolito Borghese, Italian painter (born unknown)
March 10 - Giovanni Battista Paggi, Italian painter (born 1554)
May 3 - Francesco Zucco, Italian painter (born 1570)
May 20 - Giovanni Paolo Cavagna, Italian painter (born 1556)
June - Sir Nathaniel Bacon, painter of kitchen and market scenes with large vegetables, fruit, and buxom maids (born 1585)
August 5 - Aart Jansz Druyvesteyn, Dutch Golden Age painter (born 1577)
August 27 - Francesco Maria del Monte, Italian Cardinal and arts patron (Caravaggio) (born 1549)
date unknown
Piermaria Bagnadore, Italian painter and architect (born 1556)
Tiberio di Tito, Italian painter of portraits, including small pencil portraits (born 1573)
Bartolomé González y Serrano,  Spanish Baroque portrait painter (born 1564)
Jacopo Ligozzi, Italian painter, illustrator, designer, and miniaturist of the late Renaissance and early Mannerist styles (born 1547)
Juan de Mesa, Spanish sculptor (born 1583)
Adam van Vianen, Dutch Golden Age medallist, engraver and silversmith (born 1568)
1627/1632: Rafael Sadeler II, Flemish engraver of the Sadeler family (born 1584)

References

 
Years of the 17th century in art
1620s in art